Olivia Vivian (born 13 July 1989 in Perth) is an Australian artistic gymnast who competed in the 2008 Summer Olympics. After competing at the 2008 Olympics, Vivian competed for Oregon State University in NCAA gymnastics for four years. She also competed in the 2005, 2006, and 2014 World Championships. Vivian won a silver medal with the Australian team at the 2014 Commonwealth Games. In 2020, she was one of several former gymnasts to speak out about a "toxic" culture within the country's elite programme.

Personal life
Olivia Vivian was born on 13 July 1989 in Perth, Australia. Her father, Craig, was a plumber, and her mother, Gillian, is a real estate agent. She started gymnastics when she was eight after originally being in ballet. Her first gym was Claremont P.C.Y.C, and her first coach was Julia Clapsis. Her favourite apparatus is uneven bars. Her father died of cancer in 2013. She is in a relationship with fellow Australian Ninja Warrior finalist (seasons 1 & 2), Ben Polson. In season 4 in 2020, she lost to him by a photo finish at the Power Tower. Polson went on to become Australia's first ever Ninja Warrior, while also setting the World Record for conquering the world's highest Warped Wall at 5.8m in just one attempt in 2021, while Vivian became the first woman in Australia to advance to stage 2 of the Grand Final, and did so again in 2021.

Elite career (2005-2008)
Vivian competed at both the 2005 and 2006 World Championships. In 2005, she finished thirteenth on uneven bars, and in 2006, she finished twelfth on uneven bars and sixth with the team.

2008 Olympics
Vivian was selected to represent Australia at the 2008 Summer Olympics where she competed on uneven bars. She scored a 14.925 in the qualification round which helped Australia qualify fifth into the team final. In the team final, Vivian scored a 15.100 to help Australia finish in a historic sixth place.

Collegiate career (2009-2012)
Vivian competed for the Oregon State Beavers. She was limited to uneven bars her freshman year due to multiple injuries. She helped Oregon State win the 2011 PAC-10 Conference Championships, their first Conference title since 1996. Vivian was also the PAC-10 Co-Champion on uneven bars, and she finished sixth at the NCAA Championships. In her senior year, she was the 2012 NCAA Regional Co-Champion on uneven bars.

Elite comeback (2012-2016)
At the 2014 Commonwealth Games, Vivian competed on all four events and helped her team win the silver medal. Despite having the 4th highest bar score on the uneven bars, she did not qualify into the apparatus event finals because of the two-per country rule. She qualified eleventh into the all-around final with a score of 50.765, the highest of the Australian gymnasts. In the all-around final, she finished fifth with a score of 52.632. Vivian was selected to compete at the 2014 World Artistic Gymnastics Championships where she helped her team finish seventh.

Olivia Vivian retired from gymnastics in October of 2016, and she joined Cirque Du Soleil.

TV Appearances

Ninja Warrior
In 2017 she was a competitor in the inaugural season of Australian Ninja Warrior. In July 2018 she competed on Australian Ninja Warrior again for season 2. She was the only woman to make it to the Grand Final. She then competed on American Ninja Warrior: USA vs. The World in 2019 alongside Jack Wilson, Australian Ninja Warrior (season 1) contestant, Bryson Klein, Australian Ninja Warrior (season 2) contestant, Ashlin Herbert, Australian Ninja Warrior (season 3) contestant and boyfriend, Ben Polson, Australian Ninja Warrior contestant (seasons 1-4) and first ever Australian Ninja Warrior winner in 2020. In 2019 she became the only woman to make it to the Grand Final 2 years in a row. In 2020 she became the only female competitor worldwide to reach the second stage of Grand Final, and also finish 5 stages in a calendar year as she and Ben Polson both also competed for Western Australia in the first State of Origin series. She also competed for Team Australia that won gold medal on American Ninja Warrior: USA vs. The World in 2020.

Ninja World Championships
In September 2019, Vivian competed in the inaugural Ninja World Championships in Moscow Russia, winning the Gold Medal in 4 minutes 00 seconds. Her fastest run in the qualifying rounds of 3 minutes 15 seconds established the women's World Record for the international standard 160m long "speed" course, a format used in the American Ninja Warrior: Ninja vs. Ninja course. Vivan is the Ninja Athlete Advisory Council Chair at World Obstacle.

The Celebrity Apprentice

In September 2020, Vivian was announced as a celebrity contestant on the revived new season of The Celebrity Apprentice Australia in 2021.

References

External links
 
 
 
 
 
 
 
 
 

1989 births
Living people
Australian female artistic gymnasts
Australian Ninja Warrior contestants
Gymnasts at the 2008 Summer Olympics
Olympic gymnasts of Australia
Sportswomen from Western Australia
Oregon State Beavers women's gymnasts
Gymnasts at the 2014 Commonwealth Games
Sportspeople from Perth, Western Australia
Commonwealth Games silver medallists for Australia
Commonwealth Games medallists in gymnastics
The Apprentice Australia candidates
21st-century Australian women
Medallists at the 2014 Commonwealth Games